Sir Nigel Thomas Loveridge Fisher, MC (14 July 1913 – 9 October 1996) was a Conservative Party politician in the United Kingdom.

Early life
Son of naval officer Sir Thomas Fisher and Aimée Constance, daughter of Walter Loveridge, of Oaken, Staffordshire, Fisher was educated at Eton College and Trinity College, Cambridge. He was in the Welsh Guards of the British Army during World War II, serving as a major in north west Europe. He was awarded the Military Cross on the field in 1945. He became a partner in a London firm of surveyors.

Parliamentary career
Fisher contested Chislehurst in 1945. He was Member of Parliament for Hitchin from 1950 to 1955, and for Surbiton from 1955 to 1983 – preceding Richard Tracey. He was parliamentary private secretary to Gwilym Lloyd George from 1951 and a junior minister for the Colonies from 1962 to 1963, and for Commonwealth Relations and the Colonies from 1963 to 1964.

Fisher wrote in 1973 the first biography of his close friend, the Tory statesman, Iain Macleod. Like Macleod, Fisher was on the liberal wing of the Tory party, opposing capital punishment and supporting homosexual law reform. He was one of two Conservative MPs who refused to vote for the Commonwealth Immigrants Act 1962 and one of fifteen who voted against the Commonwealth Immigrants Act 1968.

Family
In 1935, Fisher married Lady Gloria Vaughan, daughter of Ernest Edmund Henry Malet Vaughan, 7th Earl of Lisburne, and had two children. Their son Mark Fisher was a Labour Party MP. He and his first wife divorced in 1952, and in 1956 he married erstwhile Ulster Unionist Party MP Patricia Ford. He was knighted in the 1974 New Year Honours "for political and public services." By his mother's second marriage to the Liberal politician Sir Geoffrey Shakespeare, 1st Baronet, Fisher was half-brother of the medical practitioner Sir William Geoffrey Shakespeare, 2nd Baronet, whose son is the sociologist and bioethicist Tom Shakespeare.

References

Times Guide to the House of Commons, 1950, 1966 & 1979

Independent obituary

External links 
 

 
 

1913 births
1996 deaths
Conservative Party (UK) MPs for English constituencies
Knights Bachelor
Politicians awarded knighthoods
People educated at Eton College
Welsh Guards officers
Recipients of the Military Cross
UK MPs 1950–1951
UK MPs 1951–1955
UK MPs 1955–1959
UK MPs 1959–1964
UK MPs 1964–1966
UK MPs 1966–1970
UK MPs 1970–1974
UK MPs 1974
UK MPs 1974–1979
UK MPs 1979–1983
Ministers in the Macmillan and Douglas-Home governments, 1957–1964
Spouses of British politicians